The Centre Commercial Bab Ezzouar is a shopping mall in Algiers, Algeria.

The construction of the Centre Commercial Bab Ezzouar was in charge of the Swiss bank Valartis. Construction began in May 2007 and was planned for completion in November 2009; however, after problems arose the mall opening was delayed until August 2010.

References

External links
 Official website
 SCCA
 Jelmoli
 Video

Shopping malls established in 2009
Shopping malls in Algeria
Buildings and structures in Algiers
Tourist attractions in Algiers
2009 establishments in Algeria
21st-century architecture in Algeria